This is a list of species of the hister beetle genus Operclipygus, of which there are currently 177

A
 Operclipygus abbreviatus Caterino & Tishechkin, 2013
 Operclipygus andinus Caterino & Tishechkin, 2013
 Operclipygus angulifer Caterino & Tishechkin, 2013
 Operclipygus angustisternus (Wenzel, 1944)
 Operclipygus arnaudi Dégallier, 1982
 Operclipygus arquus Caterino & Tishechkin, 2013
 Operclipygus ashei Caterino & Tishechkin, 2013
 Operclipygus assimilis Caterino & Tishechkin, 2013
 Operclipygus atlanticus Caterino & Tishechkin, 2013

B
 Operclipygus baylessae Caterino & Tishechkin, 2013
 Operclipygus belemensis Caterino & Tishechkin, 2013
 Operclipygus bickhardti Caterino & Tishechkin, 2013
 Operclipygus bicolor Caterino & Tishechkin, 2013
 Operclipygus bidessois (Marseul, 1889)
 Operclipygus bosquesecus Caterino & Tishechkin, 2013
 Operclipygus britannicus Caterino & Tishechkin, 2013
 Operclipygus brooksi Caterino & Tishechkin, 2013
 Operclipygus bulbistoma Caterino & Tishechkin, 2013

C
 Operclipygus callifrons Caterino & Tishechkin, 2013
 Operclipygus campbelli Caterino & Tishechkin, 2013
 Operclipygus carinisternus Caterino & Tishechkin, 2013
 Operclipygus carinistrius (Lewis, 1908)
 Operclipygus cavisternus Caterino & Tishechkin, 2013
 Operclipygus cephalicus Caterino & Tishechkin, 2013
 Operclipygus chamelensis Caterino & Tishechkin, 2013
 Operclipygus chiapensis Caterino & Tishechkin, 2013
 Operclipygus colombicus Caterino & Tishechkin, 2013
 Operclipygus communis Caterino & Tishechkin, 2013
 Operclipygus confertus Caterino & Tishechkin, 2013
 Operclipygus confluens Caterino & Tishechkin, 2013
 Operclipygus conquisitus (Lewis, 1902)
 Operclipygus crenatus (Lewis, 1888)
 Operclipygus crenulatus Caterino & Tishechkin, 2013
 Operclipygus curtistrius Caterino & Tishechkin, 2013

D
 Operclipygus dentatus Caterino & Tishechkin, 2013
 Operclipygus depressus (Hinton, 1935)
 Operclipygus diffluens Caterino & Tishechkin, 2013
 Operclipygus disconnectus Caterino & Tishechkin, 2013
 Operclipygus distinctus (Hinton, 1935)
 Operclipygus distractus (Schmidt, 1896)
 Operclipygus dubitabilis (Marseul, 1889)
 Operclipygus dubius (Lewis, 1888)
 Operclipygus dybasi Caterino & Tishechkin, 2013
 Operclipygus dytiscoides Caterino & Tishechkin, 2013

E
 Operclipygus ecitonis Caterino & Tishechkin, 2013
 Operclipygus elongatus Caterino & Tishechkin, 2013
 Operclipygus extraneus Caterino & Tishechkin, 2013

F
 Operclipygus falini Caterino & Tishechkin, 2013
 Operclipygus faltistrius Caterino & Tishechkin, 2013
 Operclipygus farctissimus Caterino & Tishechkin, 2013
 Operclipygus farctus (Marseul, 1864)
 Operclipygus florifauensis Caterino & Tishechkin, 2013
 Operclipygus formicatus Caterino & Tishechkin, 2013
 Operclipygus fossipygus (Wenzel, 1944)
 Operclipygus foveipygus (Bickhardt, 1918)
 Operclipygus foveiventris Caterino & Tishechkin, 2013
 Operclipygus friburgius (Marseul, 1864)
 Operclipygus fungicolus (Wenzel & Dybas, 1941)
 Operclipygus fusistrius Caterino & Tishechkin, 2013

G
 Operclipygus geometricus (Casey, 1893)
 Operclipygus gibbulus (Schmidt, 1889)
 Operclipygus gilli Caterino & Tishechkin, 2013
 Operclipygus granulipectus Caterino & Tishechkin, 2013
 Operclipygus gratus Caterino & Tishechkin, 2013
 Operclipygus guianensis Caterino & Tishechkin, 2013

H
 Operclipygus hamistrius (Schmidt, 1893)
 Operclipygus hintoni Caterino & Tishechkin, 2013
 Operclipygus hirsutipes Caterino & Tishechkin, 2013
 Operclipygus hospes (Lewis, 1902)

I
 Operclipygus ibiscus Caterino & Tishechkin, 2013
 Operclipygus ignifer Caterino & Tishechkin, 2013
 Operclipygus iheringi (Bickhardt, 1917)
 Operclipygus impositus Caterino & Tishechkin, 2013
 Operclipygus impressicollis Caterino & Tishechkin, 2013
 Operclipygus impressifrons Caterino & Tishechkin, 2013
 Operclipygus impressistrius Caterino & Tishechkin, 2013
 Operclipygus impuncticollis (Hinton, 1935)
 Operclipygus impunctipennis (Hinton, 1935)
 Operclipygus incisus Caterino & Tishechkin, 2013
 Operclipygus inflatus Caterino & Tishechkin, 2013
 Operclipygus innocuus Caterino & Tishechkin, 2013
 Operclipygus inquilinus Caterino & Tishechkin, 2013
 Operclipygus intersectus Caterino & Tishechkin, 2013
 Operclipygus intermissus Caterino & Tishechkin, 2013
 Operclipygus itoupe Caterino & Tishechkin, 2013

J
 Operclipygus juninensis Caterino & Tishechkin, 2013

K
 Operclipygus kerga (Marseul, 1870)

L
 Operclipygus lama Mazur, 1988
 Operclipygus latemarginatus (Bickhardt, 1920)
 Operclipygus latifoveatus Caterino & Tishechkin, 2013
 Operclipygus latipygus Caterino & Tishechkin, 2013
 Operclipygus limonensis Caterino & Tishechkin, 2013
 Operclipygus lissipygus Caterino & Tishechkin, 2013
 Operclipygus longidens Caterino & Tishechkin, 2013
 Operclipygus lucanoides Caterino & Tishechkin, 2013
 Operclipygus lunulus Caterino & Tishechkin, 2013

M
 Operclipygus maesi Caterino & Tishechkin, 2013
 Operclipygus mangiferus Caterino & Tishechkin, 2013
 Operclipygus marginellus (LeConte, 1860)
 Operclipygus marginipennis Caterino & Tishechkin, 2013
 Operclipygus minutus Caterino & Tishechkin, 2013
 Operclipygus mirabilis (Wenzel & Dybas, 1941)
 Operclipygus montanus Caterino & Tishechkin, 2013
 Operclipygus mortavis Caterino & Tishechkin, 2013
 Operclipygus mutuca Caterino & Tishechkin, 2013

N
 Operclipygus nicodemus Caterino & Tishechkin, 2013
 Operclipygus nitidus Caterino & Tishechkin, 2013
 Operclipygus novateutoniae Caterino & Tishechkin, 2013
 Operclipygus nubosus Caterino & Tishechkin, 2013

O
 Operclipygus occultus Caterino & Tishechkin, 2013
 Operclipygus olivensis Caterino & Tishechkin, 2013
 Operclipygus orchidophilus Caterino & Tishechkin, 2013

P
 Operclipygus pacificus Caterino & Tishechkin, 2013
 Operclipygus panamensis (Wenzel & Dybas, 1941)
 Operclipygus paraguensis Caterino & Tishechkin, 2013
 Operclipygus parallelus Caterino & Tishechkin, 2013
 Operclipygus parensis Caterino & Tishechkin, 2013
 Operclipygus pauperculus Caterino & Tishechkin, 2013
 Operclipygus pecki Caterino & Tishechkin, 2013
 Operclipygus peregrinus Caterino & Tishechkin, 2013
 Operclipygus perplexus Caterino & Tishechkin, 2013
 Operclipygus petrovi Caterino & Tishechkin, 2013
 Operclipygus pichinchensis Caterino & Tishechkin, 2013
 Operclipygus planifrons Caterino & Tishechkin, 2013
 Operclipygus plaumanni Caterino & Tishechkin, 2013
 Operclipygus plicatus (Hinton, 1935)
 Operclipygus plicicollis (Schmidt, 1893)
 Operclipygus praecinctus Caterino & Tishechkin, 2013
 Operclipygus profundipygus Caterino & Tishechkins, 2013
 Operclipygus prolixus Caterino & Tishechkin, 2013
 Operclipygus prominens Caterino & Tishechkin, 2013
 Operclipygus propinquus Caterino & Tishechkin, 2013
 Operclipygus proximus Caterino & Tishechkin, 2013
 Operclipygus punctatissimus Caterino & Tishechkin, 2013
 Operclipygus punctifrons Caterino & Tishechkin, 2013
 Operclipygus punctissipygus Caterino & Tishechkin, 2013
 Operclipygus punctistrius Caterino & Tishechkin, 2013
 Operclipygus pustulifer Caterino & Tishechkin, 2013
 Operclipygus punctipleurus Caterino & Tishechkin, 2013
 Operclipygus punctiventer Caterino & Tishechkin, 2013
 Operclipygus punctulatus Caterino & Tishechkin, 2013
 Operclipygus pygidialis (Lewis, 1908)

Q
 Operclipygus quadratus Caterino & Tishechkin, 2013
 Operclipygus quinquestriatus Caterino & Tishechkin, 2013

R
 Operclipygus remotus Caterino & Tishechkin, 2013
 Operclipygus rileyi Caterino & Tishechkin, 2013
 Operclipygus rubidus (Hinton, 1935)
 Operclipygus rufescens Caterino & Tishechkin, 2013
 Operclipygus rupicolus Caterino & Tishechkin, 2013

S
 Operclipygus schlingeri Caterino & Tishechkin, 2013
 Operclipygus schmidti Caterino & Tishechkin, 2013
 Operclipygus sejunctus (Schmidt, 1896)
 Operclipygus selvorum Caterino & Tishechkin, 2013
 Operclipygus setiventris Caterino & Tishechkin, 2013
 Operclipygus shorti Caterino & Tishechkin, 2013
 Operclipygus siluriformis Caterino & Tishechkin, 2013
 Operclipygus simplicipygus Caterino & Tishechkin, 2013
 Operclipygus simplistrius Caterino & Tishechkin, 2013
 Operclipygus sinuatus Caterino & Tishechkin, 2013
 Operclipygus striatellus (Fall, 1917)
 Operclipygus subdepressus (Schmidt, 1889)
 Operclipygus subrufus Caterino & Tishechkin, 2013
 Operclipygus subsphaericus Caterino & Tishechkin, 2013
 Operclipygus subterraneus Caterino & Tishechkin, 2013
 Operclipygus subviridis Caterino & Tishechkin, 2013
 Operclipygus sulcistrius Marseul, 1870

T
 Operclipygus teapensis (Marseul, 1853)
 Operclipygus tenuis Caterino & Tishechkin, 2013
 Operclipygus therondi Wenzel, 1976
 Operclipygus tiputinus Caterino & Tishechkin, 2013
 Operclipygus tripartitus Caterino & Tishechkin, 2013
 Operclipygus troglodytes Caterino & Tishechkin, 2013

V
 Operclipygus validus Caterino & Tishechkin, 2013
 Operclipygus variabilis Caterino & Tishechkin, 2013
 Operclipygus vorax Caterino & Tishechkin, 2013

W
 Operclipygus wenzeli Caterino & Tishechkin, 2013

Y
 Operclipygus yasuni Caterino & Tishechkin, 2013

References

Histeridae